Kukuli (Quechua for white-winged dove) is an archaeological site with rock paintings and tombs in Peru. It is located in the Arequipa Region, Caravelí Province, Caravelí District.

References 

Archaeological sites in Peru
Archaeological sites in Arequipa Region
Rock art in South America
Tombs in Peru